Francis Barrett (born probably in London around 1770–1780, died after 1802) was an English occultist.

Background
Barrett, an Englishman, claimed himself to be a student of chemistry, metaphysics and natural occult philosophy. He was known to be an extreme eccentric who gave lessons in the magical arts in his apartment and fastidiously translated Kabbalistic and other ancient texts into English, such as von Welling's work, Philosophy of The Universe circa 1735, from German (1801). According to his biographer Francis X. King, Barrett's parents were humble folk married in the parish of St. Martin's in the Fields on 29 September 1772.

The Magus

Barrett was enthusiastic about reviving interest in the occult arts, and published a magical textbook called The Magus. It was a compilation, almost entirely consisting of selections from Cornelius Agrippa's Three Books of Occult Philosophy, the Fourth Book of Occult Philosophy attributed to Agrippa, and Robert Turner's 1655 translation of the Heptameron of Peter of Abano. Barrett made modifications and modernized spelling and syntax.

The Magus dealt with the natural magic of herbs and stones, magnetism, talismanic magic, alchemy, numerology, the elements, and biographies of famous adepts from history.

The Magus also served as an advertising tool. In it Barrett sought interested people wanting to help form his magic circle. An advertisement in The Magus (Vol. 2, p. 140) refers to an otherwise unknown school founded by Barrett.

According to the advertisement:

Views
When writing about witches Barrett stated that he did not believe that their power to torment or kill by enchantment, touch or by using a wax effigy came from Satan. He claimed if the Devil wanted to kill a man guilty of deadly sin, he did not need a witch as an intermediary.

Barrett's belief in magical power might be summed up this way:

References

Sources 
 Francis King, The Flying Sorcerer (Oxford: Mandrake, 1992)
 Jason Semmens, “The Magus in Cornwall: An Unknown Chapter in the Life of Francis Barrett, F.R.C.” Old Cornwall 13, No. 1 (2003) pp. 18–21. 
 Timothy D’Arch Smith, The Books of the Beast (London, 1987) pp. 89–97.

External links 
The Magus or Celestial Intelligencer at Sacred Texts
Biography of Francis Barrett

English occult writers
18th-century English educators
18th-century births

19th-century deaths
Year of birth uncertain
Year of death uncertain
English male non-fiction writers
19th-century male writers
19th-century occultists
Ceremonial magicians